The 2006 Canberra Raiders season was the 25th in the club's history. They competed in the NRL's 2006 Telstra Premiership, finishing the regular season 7th (out of 15) to make the finals. They were knocked out of the play-offs in the first week by the Bulldogs.

Season summary

The Raiders started the 2006 season heavy favourites to run last, however the raiders' players believed that they could make the top 8, but despite this external pessimism and heavy losses to the Knights and the Roosters early on, fought back and guaranteed themselves a finals berth with a round to play. 2006 saw club stalwarts Simon Woolford, newly named captain, Clinton Schifcofske and the club's longest serving player, Jason Croker, leave the club, going to St George Illawarra, the Queensland Reds rugby union team and the Super League club the Catalans Dragons respectively. Outgoing backs Schifcofske and Adam Mogg both earned representative berths with Queensland in State of Origin. Saturday 9 September 2006 saw Jason Croker, Simon Woolford, Clinton Schifcofske, Michael Hodgson, Jason Smith and Adam Mogg all play their final games for the club. The round one finals series clash with the Bulldogs saw the Raiders defeated 30-12 in slippery and muddy conditions at Telstra Stadium, and eliminated from the 2006 premiership race. This was also the final match for coach Matthew Elliott, who is coaching Penrith in 2007. His replacement was former North Queensland Cowboys' assistant coach Neil Henry.

Season results

Club Awards

Season Ladder

References

Canberra Raiders seasons
Canberra Raiders season